Sword and Sorcery Studios (S&SS) was an imprint of White Wolf, Inc., used to publish its d20 System & Open Gaming License material in from 2000 to 2008. The imprint also acted as publisher for other small press game developers, such as Monte Cook's company, Malhavoc Press, and Necromancer Games.

History
The principals at White Wolf Publishing saw that d20 was going to be a big deal for the roleplaying industry, so they were in the process of forming the Sword & Sorcery Studio — a new department to publish d20 products. White Wolf needed someone with expertise in the legal and mechanical issues related to the d20 trademark license, which led to asking Necromancer Games for help in forming White Wolf's "Sword & Sorcery" imprint, with the understanding that it would publish not only the works of the Sword & Sorcery Studio, but the books of Necromancer Games as well.  The partnership between White Wolf and Necromancer was announced on September 13, 2000.

When White Wolf announced their partnership with Necromancer Games, they also stated that they were working with a third partner, the "Sword & Sorcery Studio," which was actually the division of White Wolf dedicated to producing d20 content, and gave its name to White Wolf's new d20 imprint: Sword & Sorcery.  White Wolf produced the first Sword & Sorcery book, the Creature Collection (2000), a book of monsters; Clark Peterson and Bill Webb of Necromancer Games put Creature Collection together, but the writing came from White Wolf.

Products
 d20 Sword & Sorcery series – d20 system/Dungeons & Dragons 3rd edition compatible sourcebooks
 Scarred Lands – campaign setting for Dungeons & Dragons
 Ravenloft campaign setting – the company held the license to publish the 3rd edition version of it. 
 EverQuest Role-Playing Game – licensed pencil and paper game line
 Warcraft the Roleplaying Game  – licensed pencil and paper game line
 Monte Cook's Arcana Unearthed and Arcana Evolved series

References

External links

Role-playing game publishing companies
White Wolf Publishing